Edílson Tavares dos Santos or simply Edílson (born March 25, 1993 in Petrópolis), is a Brazilian footballer who plays as an attacking midfielder.

He has played in the Campeonato Paulista for Santo André and Linense as well as for Palmeiras.

References

External links
Edílson at ZeroZero

1993 births
Living people
Brazilian footballers
Brazilian expatriate footballers
Esporte Clube Santo André players
Sociedade Esportiva Palmeiras players
Fluminense FC players
CR Flamengo footballers
Sport Club Corinthians Paulista players
Clube Atlético Linense players
Clube Atlético Penapolense players
Giresunspor footballers
Esporte Clube Juventude players
Associação Atlética Santa Rita players
Borneo F.C. players
Al-Najma SC (Bahrain) players
Cianorte Futebol Clube players
Oeste Futebol Clube players
Lagarto Futebol Clube players
Campeonato Brasileiro Série B players
Campeonato Brasileiro Série D players
Liga 1 (Indonesia) players
Association football midfielders
Brazilian expatriate sportspeople in Turkey
Brazilian expatriate sportspeople in Indonesia
Brazilian expatriate sportspeople in Bahrain
Expatriate footballers in Turkey
Expatriate footballers in Indonesia
Expatriate footballers in Bahrain
People from Petrópolis
Sportspeople from Rio de Janeiro (state)